Lanseria International Airport  is a privately owned international airport that is situated north of Randburg and Sandton to the northwest of Johannesburg, South Africa.  The airport can handle aircraft up to the size of a Boeing 757-300 and the airport was created to ease traffic congestion at OR Tambo International Airport.

Location

It is located within the boundaries of the City of Johannesburg Metropolitan Municipality, at the north-western edge (south-west of Centurion and Pretoria). Its entrance is on the R512 Road, which goes south to Randburg and north to the Hartbeespoort Dam.

History
Lanseria Airport started out as a grass strip airfield in 1972, the brainchild of two Pretoria pilots: Fanie Haacke and Abe Sher. The land was originally bought by Krugersdorp and Roodepoort Municipality together with the Transvaal Peri-Urban Board and contracted to Lanseria Management Company on a 99-year lease since 1972.

The airport was officially opened by the Minister of Transport at the time, Hannes Rall, on 16 August 1974. Soon after its opening, Lanseria Airport hosted the Air Africa '75 (in 1975).

When Nelson Mandela was released from prison in 1990 he was flown to Johannesburg landing at Lanseria Airport.

On 15 November 2012 the airport was sold to a consortium consisting of Harith, an infrastructure development fund management company; the women's empowerment company Nozala; and the Government Employee Pension Fund, through the Public Investment Corporation.

On 11 November 2013 the airport opened its new 45-meter-wide 07/25 Runway and also closed the existing 30-meter-wide 06/24 runway. Kulula was the first airline to land on the new runway.

In November 2017 airport officials announced that they were negotiating with Air Namibia, Kenya Airways, Air Mauritius and Air Botswana for flights to and from the airport as part of their expansion plan.

Aerodrome information
Runway 07 is equipped with ILS CAT I and is directed at 047° east of true north. The single runway has a 1.5% gradient, sloping up towards the southwest end of the runway; despite this gradient, the preferred landing direction is from the southwest, landing on Runway 07, because the winds are usually northerly, blowing south.

Airlines and destinations

Passenger

Cargo

Other facilities
National Airways has its head office building on the airport property.

Various maintenance and avionics companies are situated on the airport including Interjet Maintenance, MPT Maintenance, ExecuJet, Lanseria Jet centre and NAC with various other smaller outfits. The maintenance facilities at Lanseria International Airport provide small to midsize aircraft maintenance mainly focused on corporate aircraft and small regional airliners, up to a Bombardier CRJ700 or similar.

Accidents and incidents
8 October 1977 – During Airshow Africa '77 – a Britten-Norman Trislander performed a wing-over but had insufficient altitude to recover and the aircraft impacted the runway, bounced into the air and came to rest 500 m to the side of the runway. The flying controls were disabled and main gear detached. One wing engine detached. The crew were not injured but the aircraft was written off.
On 2 October 1993, an Impala Mark I (no. 489) of the SAAF Silver Falcons aerobatic team crashed after suffering separation of the right wing during a performance at the Lanseria Airshow. The pilot ejected but was killed, as the ejection was initiated outside of the design envelope of the ejection seat.

References

External links

Lanseria Airport Homepage
Private site about Lanseria International Airport – History, statistics, airlines, road access, parking, car rental...
Aerial Photograph on Google Maps
https://www.gov.za/documents/draft-greater-lanseria-masterplan-3-nov-2020-0000

Airports in Johannesburg
Airports in South Africa
Privately owned airports